A gendarmerie or gendarmery is a military police forces, border guards, security forces, and coast guards component with jurisdiction in civil law enforcement. The term maréchaussée (or marshalcy) may also be used (e.g., Royal Marechaussee) but is now uncommon.

Although pioneered in France, the concept of a gendarmerie was adopted by several other European nations during the Napoleonic Wars. It remains an integral part of the military establishment in most Francophone states and territories. A somewhat related phenomenon has been the formation of paramilitary units which fall under the authority of civilian police agencies. Since these are not strictly military forces, however, they are not considered gendarmerie.

List of active gendarmeries

Ranks

List of former gendarmeries

See also

 List of law enforcement agencies
 Gendarmerie (disambiguation)
 Military aid to the civil power
 Militarization of police
 Paramilitary
 Military police
 Police
 Carabinier
 Field Force
 National Guard (disambiguation)
 United States National Guard
 State Police (United States)
 Constabulary
 People's Armed Police
 International Association of Gendarmeries and Police Forces with Military Status

Notes

References